Lucia (minor planet designation: 222 Lucia) is a large Themistian asteroid. It was discovered by Johann Palisa on 9 February 1882 in Vienna and named after Lucia, daughter of Austro-Hungarian explorer Graf Wilczek.

This object is spectral C-type and is probably composed of primitive carbonaceous material. Based upon analysis of infrared spectra, it has a diameter of 59.8 ± 0.8 km. This object belongs to the Themis family, which was formed by the break-up of a larger parent body about a billion years ago.

References

External links 
 Lightcurve plot of 222 Lucia, Palmer Divide Observatory, B. D. Warner (1999)
 Asteroid Lightcurve Database (LCDB), query form (info )
 Dictionary of Minor Planet Names, Google books
 Asteroids and comets rotation curves, CdR – Observatoire de Genève, Raoul Behrend
 Discovery Circumstances: Numbered Minor Planets (1)-(5000) – Minor Planet Center
 
 

000222
Discoveries by Johann Palisa
Named minor planets
000222
18820209